Argentina and Iran signed a memorandum of understanding in 2013 for a joint investigation of the AMIA terrorist attack. The full name was Memorandum of understanding between the Government of Argentina and the Government of Islamic Republic of Iran on the issues related to the terrorist attack against AMIA headquarter in Buenos Aires on 18 July 1994. One of the proponents for the memorandum, former president Cristina Kirchner described it as "a historical event" and considered that the agreement would serve to advance the investigation of the AMIA attack.

Although in 2013 the Argentine Congress approved the bill regarding the memorandum, the Iranian Parliament did not. It was declared as voided by the Argentine Federal Chamber of Cassation in December 2015, shortly after the inauguration of former Argentine president Mauricio Macri.

History
The AMIA bombing was a terrorist attack on the Asociación Mutual Israelita Argentina, a large Jewish Community Center in Buenos Aires, which took place on 18 July 1994. The legal case is still open. The prosecutor Alberto Nisman accused Iran in 2006 of directing the attack, and the Hezbollah militia of carrying it out.

Argentina signed a memorandum of understanding with Iran in 2013, during the Cristina Fernández de Kirchner presidency. The memorandum agreed to enable the questioning of the Iranians accused by Nisman and to establish a "truth commission" to analyze evidence related to the accused persons. As the Kirchners had the majority at both chambers of the Argentine Congress, the bill was approved without problem. Nisman opposed the memorandum, and argued that it "constitutes a wrongful interference of the Executive Branch". The Delegación de Asociaciones Israelitas Argentinas, the umbrella organization of Argentina's Jewish community, filled a petition to declare it unconstitutional, pointing evidence of Iranian involvement in the attack. The memorandum was declared unconstitutional, and the government appealed the ruling. Because of this trial, and the lack of Iranian approval, the memorandum did not enter into force. The appeal was evaluated by the Court of Cassation, the highest criminal court of the country. The process was delayed by the controversial removal of judge Luis Maria Cabral, who was replaced with another judge more supportive of the government's agenda.

Nisman also denounced the president Cristina Fernández de Kirchner and the chancellor Héctor Timerman of cover-up, for the signing of the memorandum. He was found dead in his home the day before he could present his case to the Congress; the case on his murder is still open as well. The denounce against Fernández de Kirchner was swiftly archived.

The Front for Victory lost the 2015 presidential elections, and Mauricio Macri became the new president on 10 December. He immediately instructed the minister of Justice Germán Garavano to withdraw the appeal, which ratified the ruling that declared it unconstitutional. This was praised by the Prime Minister of Israel Benjamin Netanyahu: "This is a welcome change of direction, and I hope we will see a significant improvement of Argentina-Israeli relations as well as a change for the better in relations with other countries in South America in the coming years".

See also
 Argentina–Iran relations
 Death of Alberto Nisman

References

External links
 Copy of the Memorandum 

Argentina–Iran relations
Treaties of Argentina
Treaties of Iran
Presidency of Cristina Fernández de Kirchner
2013 establishments in Argentina
Repealed Argentine legislation
2015 disestablishments in Argentina
Treaties concluded in 2013
Unratified treaties
Jewish Argentine history